Snow City is Singapore's first indoor snow centre located within the Science Centre Singapore area beside the Omni-Theatre in Jurong East.

Background
The 3,000 sq-metre centre Snow City was built at the cost of S$6 million and was officially opened on 3 June 2000. It was created through a joint venture by the Science Centre, Singapore and NTUC Income Co-operative Pte Ltd. This collaboration was intended to provide the residents of the tropical country of Singapore with a first-hand experience of the cold climates and snow, which they might not otherwise get.

Highlights
Visitors will first arrive at the Air Lock, which is maintained at 10°C. This 
allows visitors to acclimate to the lower temperatures before they enter the chamber itself.

The major focus of Snow City is its Snow Chamber, a 1200 sq-metre room covered with snow. The Snow Chamber is well maintained at -5°C, and the snow level is kept constantly at 40CM in depth. Between 10 and 15 tons of snow is created each week in order to maintain this level. The snow is produced using a special Snow Gun, which cools the water using liquid nitrogen.

Inside the Snow Chamber, is a 60 meter long high slope which is about 3 storeys high. 'Snowtubing' is the main activity, where visitors will be sliding down the snow slope while sitting on an inflatable tube.

There is also a Snow-Play Area for the younger children.

There is a place for wine and dine on level 2, named Alphine Lodge.

Snow City's sound educational programmes and workshops are available to schools and other interested groups.

Technology
A specially designed Snow Gun is used in the production of snow on site.

Firstly, water is atomized using high-pressure compressed air. The water then arrives at the snow gun and is pushed out of the special nozzles at the end of the barrel. Liquid nitrogen at a temperature of approx. -196°C is then passed through the snow gun simultaneously, causing the extreme cold of the liquid nitrogen to instantly freeze the atomized water into snowflake-like crystallites.

The simplified formula to produce snow is 
One ton of liquid nitrogen + one ton of water = one ton of "snow".

References

External links
 Snow City Singapore Website

Sports venues in Singapore
Jurong East
Tourist attractions in Singapore
2000 establishments in Singapore